The Doak–Little House is a historic building in South Strabane Township, Pennsylvania.

It is designated as a historic residential landmark/farmstead by the Washington County History & Landmarks Foundation.

References

External links
[ National Register nomination form]

Houses on the National Register of Historic Places in Pennsylvania
Houses completed in 1850
Houses in Washington County, Pennsylvania
National Register of Historic Places in Washington County, Pennsylvania